Lambula transcripta is a moth of the family Erebidae. It was described by Thomas Pennington Lucas in 1890. It is found in Queensland, Australia.

References

Lithosiina
Moths described in 1890